Boy O'Boy is a 2003 novel by Brian Doyle. It was named Book of the Year for Children by the Canadian Library Association.

Martin O'Boy, nicknamed Boy O'Boy, is the young narrator of this story set the summer of 1945.  Martin reflects on the ups and downs of his family and neighbours, news from World War II and the popular culture of the day, including Captain Marvel (who shares his name with Martin's friend Billy Batson).

Martin is molested by the church organist who then moves in on Billy. The two boys take their revenge on the man by sabotaging his showpiece at a celebration of the war's end. Martin later confesses what has happened to him to a soldier, a neighbour just returned from the war, who immediately confronts the organist and threatens him if he ever approaches either boy again.

See also

Pedophilia

References

2003 American novels
Child sexual abuse in literature
American young adult novels
Fiction set in 1945